Pčinja may refer to:

Pčinja District, a district of Serbia
Pčinja (river), a left tributary of the Vardar river